Verlyn Flieger (born 1933) is an author, editor, and Professor Emerita in the Department of English at the University of Maryland at College Park, where she taught courses in comparative mythology, medieval literature, and the works of J. R. R. Tolkien. She is well known as a Tolkien scholar, especially for her books Splintered Light and A Question of Time. She has won the Mythopoeic Scholarship Award four times for her work on Tolkien's Middle-earth writings.

Biography

Flieger holds a master's degree (1972) and doctorate (1977) from The Catholic University of America, and has been associated with the University of Maryland since 1976. In 2012, retiring from teaching at Maryland, Flieger began teaching Arthurian studies online at Signum University.

Her best-known books are Splintered Light: Logos and Language in Tolkien's World (1983; revised edition, 2002), which argues that light is a central theme of Tolkien's Middle-earth mythology; A Question of Time: J. R. R. Tolkien's Road to Faerie, which won the 1998 Mythopoeic Award for Inklings studies; and Interrupted Music: The Making of Tolkien's Mythology (2005). The Tolkien scholar Bradford Lee Eden describes Splintered Light as "the most important and influential book on both language and music in Tolkien's works", discussing how the two are interwoven as "central themes" throughout The Silmarillion.

She won the Mythopoeic Scholarship Award for Inklings Studies a second time in 2002 for Tolkien's Legendarium: Essays on The History of Middle-earth, which she co-edited with Carl Hostetter; J. S. Ryan, reviewing the book for VII, called it a "luminous companion" to the 12 volumes of The History of Middle-earth, and "clearly indispensable". Ryan stated that it "pays a much merited tribute" to Christopher Tolkien's six decades or more of work on his father's writings, indeed from his childhood as one of the original audience for The Hobbit. Ryan describes the 14 essays as "carefully argued", noting among other things Bratman's description of the 4 styles Tolkien used in the Legendarium as "Annalistic, Antique, Appendical, and Philosophical".

In 2013 she won the Mythopoeic Award again for Green Suns and Faërie: Essays on J. R. R. Tolkien, and in 2019, for a fourth time, for There Would Always Be a Fairy Tale: More Essays on Tolkien.

Flieger has written two young adult fantasies, Pig Tale and The Inn at Corbies' Caww, a collection of Arthurian stories, Arthurian Voices, and some short stories. With David Bratman and Michael D. C. Drout, she is co-editor of Tolkien Studies: An Annual Scholarly Review.

Books

Scholarly

 written
 1983 Splintered Light: Logos and Language in Tolkien's World (2002 edition )
 2001 A Question of Time: J.R.R. Tolkien's Road to Faerie, 2001, 
 2005 Interrupted Music: The Making Of Tolkien's Mythology, 
 2012 Green Suns and Faerie: Essays on J.R.R. Tolkien, 
 2019 There Would Always be a Fairytale: More Essays on Tolkien, 

 edited
 2000 Tolkien's Legendarium: Essays on The History of Middle-earth (with Carl Hostetter), 
 2005 Smith of Wootton Major by J.R.R. Tolkien, extended critical edition, 
 2008 Tolkien on Fairy-stories by J.R.R. Tolkien (with Douglas A. Anderson), 
 2015 The Story of Kullervo by J.R.R. Tolkien, 
 2016 The Lay of Aotrou and Itroun by J.R.R. Tolkien,

Fiction

 2000 "Avilion" in The Doom of Camelot, ed. James Lowder
 2002 Pig Tale, 
 2005 "Green Hill Country" in Seekers of Dreams, ed. Douglas A. Anderson
 2011 The Inn at Corbies' Caww, Kitsune Books, 
 2020 Arthurian Voices, The Gabbro Head Press,

References

External links
 Tolkien Studies bibliographic information at Muse

1933 births
Living people
Tolkien studies
American academics of English literature
Catholic University of America alumni
University of Maryland, College Park faculty
American short story writers